New Journey to the West is a South Korean travel-reality show that airs on tvN. This program started broadcasting on September 4, 2015 and has currently aired for 8 Seasons.

New Journey to the West's cast members are Kang Ho-dong, Lee Soo-geun, Eun Ji-won, Ahn Jae-hyun, Cho Kyu-hyun, Song Min-ho, and Pyo Ji-hoon. Inspired by the famous Chinese novel Journey to the West, in each season every cast member was dressed as a certain character and traveled to places on a mission to find mystical dragon balls. They must complete a task in order to receive dragon balls. If the members successfully gather seven dragon balls, their wishes would be granted. Over the years, this program has gained popularity and garnered high viewer ratings with its fresh ideas, fluid storyline, varying roles, and fun costumes.

History

New Journey to the West was first announced on 16 July 2015, with Na Young-seok as the chief director. The show's initial concept came from one of the original member, Lee Seung-gi, which was to travel with the other cast members and film all their activities. It was originally broadcast online via Naver TVCast and was the first project from “tvN Go,” a digital-content brand from cable channel tvN.

The show's first season reunites the former 2 Days & 1 Night Season 1 members Lee Seung-gi, Kang Ho-dong, Eun Ji-won and Lee Soo-geun. The four members each take one of the characters from the classic 16th-century Chinese novel Journey to the West as they go on a 5-days and 4 night backpacking trip through Xian, China, to play various games. The show was a success with over 42 million views on Naver TV Cast and 10 million views on Chinese portal site QQ.

After gaining positive response on the first season, the second season of the show was filmed in Chengdu, which included a new cast member Ahn Jae-hyun (replacing Lee Seung-gi who left for military conscription). Aside from airing on online platforms, the show was aired on cable channel tvN. It garnered over 100 million views in China. The third season of the show, added boy band members Kyuhyun (Super Junior) and Mino (Winner), filmed in Guilin. The fourth season of the show was filmed in Vietnam. The fifth season was filmed in Hong Kong with a new member P.O (Block B), replacing Kyuhyun who could not participate due to his mandatory military service. Then, it is continuously followed with the sixth season that was filmed in Hokkaido. The show returns for the seventh season in October 2019, with a returning Cho Kyu-hyun and was set in South Korea. However, Ahn Jae-hyun did not participate in the seventh and eighth season due to his personal family issue.

Series overview

Cast

Story plot

Season 1
In Season 1, Lee Seung Gi plays Tang Sanzang (a Buddhist monk in the novel) who leads and worries constantly about the monsters hyungs (his co-cast members) who don't listen to him. Lee Soo Geun plays Sun Wukong a monkey character with the greatest sin, Eun Ji Won plays Sha Wujing (a celestial being) who is either immature or genius villain, and Kang Ho Dong plays Zhu Bajie (a pig character) with low brain power but great strength and appetite. Together, they take a journey to the west (Xi'an, China) while completing various missions to find seven dragon balls which can grant wishes for those who collect them.

Na Young Suk PD expressed, “The four are too familiar with each other, and they know what each other is thinking just from looking at each other's eyes. Everyone had a great and fun time during the 5 days four nights trip. We are working hard on the post-production at the moment, so that the viewers can experience the fun that we all had.” Prior to the start of Season 2, tvN rebroadcast the online version of Season 1 to the TV by compiling it to two episodes on 8 and 15 April 2016.

Season 2 to 4

In Season 2 to 4, the show followed the similar concept as Season 1 as they travelled with new characters and new cast members to several parts of China and Vietnam to find the seven dragon balls.

In Season 2, Kang Ho-dong, Eun Ji-won and Lee Soo-geun with Ahn Jae-hyun (replacing Lee Seung-gi) travel to China (Chengdu and Lijiang). Each member takes on one of the characters as in Season 1 and played various games. The season started on 22 April and ended on 17 June 2016. Simultaneously, the show was also broadcast online via Naver TVCast between 19 April and 14 June 2016.

Season 2.5 consists of two new members (Mino and Kyuhyun) for familiarizing with the current members from Season 2.

In Season 3, Kang Ho-dong, Eun Ji-won, Lee Soo-geun, Ahn Jae-hyun, Mino and Kyuhyun travel to China (Guilin and Xiamen). New characters (Master Roshi and Bulma) were also introduced. The season started on 8 January and ended on 12 March 2017.

In Season 4, the show continued with the same members from Season 3 as the whole group takes a journey to Vietnam. The season started on 13 June and ended on 22 August 2017. With the new theme of "The apocalypse of Hell", each member has his new character: Kang Ho-dong plays Zhu Bajie; Lee Soo-geun plays Piccolo; Eun Ji-won plays Sun Wukong; Ahn Jae-hyun plays monk Xuan Zhang; Kyuhyun plays Sha Wujing; and since Min-ho loses the Ping-pong competition and shaves his hair, he plays the character of Krillin. In Gangshi Game, members complete all the tasks in time, Mino accurately selects the gift buttons (luxury cars) after spinning 15 turns around. Instead of giving expensive cars, Na Young-suk PD promises to give them dragon balls and other rewards. Min-ho also receives a new nickname as Song Garak (Song finger). In this Season, members successfully collect all seven dragon balls and receive their rewards from the production team. Na Young-suk PD promises to put "Kang's Kitchen" and "Youth Over Flowers" into schedule.

Season 5, 6 and 6.5
In Season 5 and 6, new sets of characters and themes (Ghost Special and Season of Harvest) were introduced as the cast members traveled to Hong Kong and Hokkaido. As Kyuhyun started his military conscription, P.O joined in as a replacement and guest member.

In Season 5, they make a journey to Hong Kong (China) with a new theme of "Ghost Special or Horror Special". In Season 6, members travelled to Hokkaido (Japan) with a new theme of "Geobong Geobong Geobong (Kyoho grape)". Then in Season 6.5, members return to Seoul (South Korea). They spend time together in a house and play different games to win the rewards. The season started on 30 September and ended on 2 December 2018. At the end of the show, the production team announced that "Kang's Kitchen 2" would return soon.

Season 7
In Season 7, Kang Ho-dong, Lee Soo-geun, Eun Ji-won, Song Mino, P.O, and a returning Cho Kyu-hyun travel around South Korea. The season started on 25 October 2019 and ended on 3 January 2020. In this season, the show was filmed in South Korea with the theme "Homecoming" and Na PD got the concept from the Spider-Man: Homecoming.

Season 8
In Season 8, current members from Season 7 returned. The theme is based on Korean traditional fairytale and is being filmed in South Korea. The season started on 9 October 2020 (Hangeul Day) and ended on 18 December 2020.

Production

Season 1
This show reunites four former cast members of the golden age of KBS '2 Days & 1 Night' in Season 1. On 16 July 2015, tvN announced that Na Young Seok PD will show a new form of variety program in fall through internet contents called 'New Journey to The West'. The production crew stated, "We invested [in the show] as a new format that will broadcast on the internet instead of TV. Right now, we are considering recruiting Lee Soo Geun, and Eun Ji Won in addition to Kang Ho Dong and Lee Seung Gi. There will be no more additions after four members are confirmed."

A CJ E&M official told Sports Chosun on 23 July 2015, ‘New Journey to the West’ is holding the first meeting of the members. On 5 August, a source involved in broadcasting said that Lee Seung Gi, Kang Ho Dong, Lee Soo Geun, Eun Ji Won, and Na Young Suk leave for China on 6 August to begin filming. Which later revealed that they heading to Xian, a city in China, for 5 days filming.

tvN announced on 18 August 2015 that "New Journey to the West" will be released exclusively through PC and mobile Naver TVCast in early September. It marked this show as the first South Korean variety show created by a TV network, tvN, to be broadcast exclusively online.

New Journey to the West production crew and members make their first official appearance through a press conference held at 63 Convention Center on the afternoon of 1 September 2015. The press conference go live on Tuesday at 2 p.m. on Naver and V app at the same time.

The show also streamed exclusively on Tencent's QQ.com in China, simultaneously with its run on South Korean portal website Naver. Seo Jang-Ho, the head of international sales and acquisitions at CJ E&M, said, "We are excited to introduce New Journey to the West to Chinese viewers through Tencent, one of the largest online platforms in the country. As the show is CJ E&M's highly anticipated digital content of the year, we hope for its successful reception in China.”

In the show press conference, Director Na said that there was no step-by-step casting process. "It all just happened very naturally when Lee Seung-gi mentioned going on a trip with the old members over a casual dinner," Na explained. “We then talked about filming it, but because it would lack completeness as a TV show, we decided to use the Internet platform.” Na stated that they wanted to make a program that is new in every ways, including genre and format. Providing busy businessmen and students with short break in the midst of their hectic daily routines. The concept about five new clips at once time release, with each clip to be about ten minutes long, make those who can't afford the time to watch all of the clips in order can just randomly pick whatever looks good for them.

Episodes

Season 1 
Destinations:Xian, China

Season 2 
Destinations:China (Chengdu and Lijiang)

Episode 1(Highlights):- The new member Ahn jayeon joins the show and they chose the roles. They added the condition for the role Monk Xuan Zhang That he will have to shave his hair Aka Lee soogeun. After reaching china the crew dumps them after some time and told them to find their lodging with no money given. They mess up the ATM card and it gets blocked. And the crew gives them a second chance they win with the help of local fans who hand guides them to their Guest house.

Season 2.5 
Season 2.5 consisted of 7 episode internet exclusive clips familiarizing the 2 new cast members, Cho Kyuhyun and Song Minho to the show among other things.

It aired on Naver TVCast between 5 and 6 January 2017.

Season 3 
Destinations:China (Guilin and Xiamen)

Season 4 
Destinations: Vietnam (Hanoi, Cat Ba, Hai Phong and Sa Pa). Theme: Hell's Apocalypse

Season 5, 6 and 6.5
Destinations: Hong Kong, Hokkaido and South Korea

Theme: 
 Season 5 (Ghost Special or Horror Special)
 Season 6 (Season of Harvest)
 Season 6.5 (3 Wise Meals A day)

Season 7
Destinations: South Korea. Theme: Homecoming, Retro Special, Innocence Special, Global Special & Cinema Special

Season 8 
Destinations: South Korea. Theme: Once Upon a Time, Retreat for Team Building, Dragon King and his friends (Once Upon a Time in the Sea)

Reception
In a survey done prior to the program's airing, 62.5% of the recipients knew about the new program, while 76.9% indicated that they would watch the program. The first trailer of the show which was revealed on 25 August 2015 via Naver TVCast exceeded more than 1 million view in less than 24 hours and became a hot topic among netizen.

The first five episodes, each spanning between five and ten minutes, were uploaded at 10 a.m. Five hours after it release, more than 50,000 people had subscribed to the channel on Naver's video streaming website TVCast, where the show is broadcast. The first episode has been viewed more than 700,000 times, with the five together recording a combined 2 million views. After 12 hours of its release, the five episodes almost hit 5 million views.

It has received positive response from the public. The show's network tvN revealed that the first five episodes, released through Naver TV Cast recorded 6.1 million hits on the first day of its release. If the trailer and the video unveiled in production presentation are also included, the number adds up to 11.5 million views as of the morning of 5 September 2015. In 3 days after its release, the first five episodes hit 8.7 million views and reach 14.4 million views altogether (including views for press conference and trailer clips).

On 8 September 2015, 'New Journey the West' Season 1 has accumulated 15 million views on Naver TV Cast since its release. In the day of the second five episodes release, 11 September, the show already attracted more than 20 million combined views online with its trailer and first episode. It made "New Journey to the West" as the first online broadcast to reach the break-even point with only advertising revenues in South Korea. Executive of CJ E&M stated, “We are likely to reap the profits earlier-than-expected thanks to a surge in viewers. Online broadcast is emerging as a new cash cow with TV ad revenues declining.”

It also received good responses in China. On 5 September 2015, 'New Journey to the West' first on QQ video real time chart, and fourth in overall QQ videos site. On 7 September, the first 5 episodes of this show already got more than 10 million views on QQ Video in China. The Second 5 episodes (episode 6-10) which released in following week, got 10 million just 2 days after its release.

Ratings
 Note that the show airs on a cable channel (pay TV), which plays part in its slower uptake and relatively small audience share when compared to programs broadcast (FTA) on public networks such as KBS, SBS, MBC or EBS.

Awards and nominations

Spin-offs

Notes

References

External links
  
  
  
  
  
  
  
  

South Korean travel television series
South Korean variety television shows
Mass media in Korea
Travel web series
2015 South Korean television series debuts
2015 web series debuts
2020s South Korean television series
Korean-language television shows
TVN (South Korean TV channel) original programming
Naver TV original programming